Ghazala Javed (1 January 1988 – 18 June 2012) was a Pashtun playback singer from Swat Valley,  Pakistan. She began singing since 2004 and was "popular with young, progressive ethnic Pashtuns in Khyber Pakhtunkhwa. Her music was famous not only in Pakistan but also in neighbouring Afghanistan and among Pashtuns around the world.

Career
Ghazala was born on 1 January 1988 in Swat Valley of Khyber Pakhtunkhwa province of Pakistan. In late 2007, the Pakistani Taliban were strengthening their grip in Swat so the young Ghazala and her family fled to the city of Peshawar. They settled in Peshawar and Ghazala began her singing career, subsequently recorded the songs "Baran dy baran dy" and "Lag rasha kana". Later in her career, she sang more melodious songs and became known amongst the Pashtun people of Pakistan, Afghanistan and those living abroad.

She began appearing in stage-shows in Dubai and Kabul where she earned $12,000 to $15,000 per night for singing at wedding parties. According to Radio Kabul director Abdul Ghani Mudaqiq, "She was paid more than any other Pashtun artist—male or female—in Kabul... She was our most requested and popular Pashto singer." Her songs "Za lewaney da mena", "Za da cha khqula ta fikar wari yem", "kho leg rasha rasha kana"and "Mena ba kawo Janana mena ba kawo" had a positive critical reception. She was nominated for a Filmfare Award in 2010 and received a Khyber Award in 2011.

Personal life

On 7 February 2010, Ghazala married Jehangir Khan, a property dealer in Peshawar, but of late was living with her father due to differences with her husband. She learned that her husband had another wife before her, leading to her separation from Javed. In November 2010, she separated from her husband and moved to her parents' home. On 12 October 2011, Ghazala filed a petition in the civil court of Asghar in Swat for divorce from Jehangir. The court decided in her favor on 4 December 2011.

Death
Ghazala, along with her father, was shot dead in a drive-by shooting by gunmen on a motorcycle, on June 18, 2012. On 16 December 2013 Swat District and Sessions Court found her former husband, Jahangir Khan guilty of killing her and her father and awarded him two death sentences along with 70 million Rs in fines. On 22 May 2014 the Peshawar High Court set aside the sentence on the basis of compromise between the heirs of the two victims and Jehangir Khan.

Discography 
 2009 – Ghazala Javed Vol.1
 2010 – Ghazala Javed And [Nazia Iqbal]
 2010 – Ghazala Javed Vol.2
 2010 – Raza Che Rogha Okro
 2011 – Best Of Ghazala Javed
 2011 – Ghazala Javed Vol.3
 2011 – Zo Spogmaii Yum
 2012 – Zhwandon TV concert in Afghanistan

See also
Women in Pakistan

References

1988 births
Pakistani women singers
Pashto-language singers
People from Swat District
2012 deaths
Pakistani murder victims
Pakistani artists
Pashtun women
Violence against women in Pakistan